Kato Kastritsi is a village and a community in the municipal unit of Rio, Achaea, Greece. The community consists of the villages Kato Kastritsi and Magoula. It is situated at about 100 m elevation in the northwestern foothills of the Panachaiko, 2 km southeast of Rio town centre, and adjacent to the campus of the University of Patras. Ano Kastritsi is 4 km to the southeast.

Historical population

See also
List of settlements in Achaea

References

Populated places in Achaea
Rio, Greece